Franklin Bradford Shakespeare (born May 31, 1930) is a former American competition rower, Olympic champion and naval officer.

Biography
Born in Philadelphia, Pennsylvania on May 31, 1930, Shakespeare won a gold medal in coxed eights at the 1952 Summer Olympics with the American team. 

In 1982, he was inducted into the Delaware Sports Museum and Hall of Fame. 

In 1996, Shakespeare ran the Olympic Torch in the relay for the 1996 Summer Olympics in Atlanta, Georgia as the only Delawarean Olympic medal winner at the time.

References

1930 births
Living people
American male rowers
Rowers at the 1952 Summer Olympics
Olympic gold medalists for the United States in rowing
Military personnel from Philadelphia
Rowers from Philadelphia
Medalists at the 1952 Summer Olympics